Felman is a surname. Notable people with the surname include:

Darío Felman (born 1951), Argentine footballer
Shoshana Felman (born 1942), American literary critic and professor

See also
Feldman
Ferman (name)
Folman

es:Felman